Brittain Ashford is an American actress, singer and songwriter best known for portraying Sonya Rostova in the 2016 Broadway musical Natasha, Pierre & The Great Comet of 1812, as well as fronting the band Prairie Empire.

Early life and education
Originally from Seattle, Washington, Ashford attended Roosevelt High School. She attended college at the University of Washington, Seattle.

Career

Theatre 
Ashford's first theatrical performance was as Sonya Rostova in the 2012 Ars Nova production of Dave Malloy's Natasha, Pierre & The Great Comet of 1812. Ashford continued to perform with the show in all future incarnations of it, including productions at Kazino, the American Repertory Theater, and at the Imperial Theatre, the latter of which marked her Broadway debut in 2016. Of her role, Ashford says, "I sympathize with Sonya, and I really love that she's there as this best friend presence that could be nothing, but she also gets this really tender, intimate, important moment in the show to talk about that friendship, which I think is just so nice and kind of refreshing." Ashford received praise for her performance as Sonya, and was nominated for multiple awards over the course of the shows multiple runs. Ashford was temporarily replaced as Sonya by singer-songwriter Ingrid Michaelson, but she returned as Sonya on August 15, 2017.

Ben Brantley of the New York Times stated in his article "The Tonys 2017: Who Will Win (and Who Should)" that Ashford "should have been nominated" for the Tony Award for Best Featured Actress in a Musical.

Ashford also performed in Dave Malloy's song-cycle Ghost Quartet. Ashford provided vocals for the show, as well as autoharp, keyboard, and percussion. She was praised for her performance as part of the quartet, with the Litro saying she "sounds like she's singing from the bottom of a sea of honey; her voice is at once lovely and perfectly eerie." Ashford stayed with the show while it performed at various venues across the US, including the American Repertory Theatre in Boston. The song-cycle re-opened at Next Door at NYTW, a black box theatre component of New York Theatre Workshop, in October 2017.

Music 
In 2008, Ashford released her first solo album, There, But for You, Go I, via the Parisian label Waterhouse Records. In June 2012, she released her first record with her band Prairie Empire. Ashford recorded Prairie Empire (Trailer Fire Records) in Portland, Oregon with support from members of the band Harlowe. Leslie Ventura of Las Vegas Weekly notes the "sheer emotive power of her voice", while Daytrotter praised the transportive capacity of the album's lyrics. Ashford has been praised for the unique and distinctive qualities of her voice, with one critic saying, "Her voice is tender, but also strong and determined…the threatened vulnerability was serenely vanquished."

In July 2016, Ashford released The Salt, her sophomore album with Prairie Empire, via Commodore Trotter Records. Ashford, who provided vocals, guitar and arrangements for the album was joined on drums by bandmate Nim Ben-Reuven, as well as Brent Arnold (cello), Jeff Hudgins (clarinet, sax, baritone sax), Danah Olivetree (cello), Alec Spiegelman (pump organ), Scott Colberg (guitar) and Matt Bauer (vocals). Additionally, the band was joined on tour by Jacki Paolella, who helped to produced The Salt at TAPTAP Records in Norfolk, Virginia. In a review for Veer Magazine, Shannon Jay said The Salt "embodies a delicate toughness", calling attention to Ashford's vocals, the "ambient complexity" of the arrangements and the album's powerful storytelling.

Ashford has also released five non-album singles under her own name: "Good for Goodness", "Time Takes Time", "Please Leave a Light on When You Go" (featuring Great Comet writer Dave Malloy, "Bells, Boxes", and "For the First Time". In December 2018, she released a four-song EP with songwriting collaborator Matt Bauer.

On February 18, 2019, Ashford announced an Indiegogo campaign to fund her second solo studio album, entitled Drama Club. The album was released on September 24, 2019. The album features covers of musical theatre songs "run through a David Lynch filter", including a new version of "Sonya Alone" from Great Comet. The first single from the album, a cover of "You're the One That I Want" from Grease, was released on March 15, 2019. A second single, a cover of her aria from Great Comet, "Sonya Alone", was released on July 16, 2019.

Theater credits

Discography

Albums
There, But For You, Go I (2008)
Drama Club (2019)

with Prairie Empire
Prairie Empire (2012)
The Salt (2016)

Extended plays
Auld Lang Syne (2012)
Tinsel and Snow & Other Mid-Winter Missives with Matt Bauer (2018)
Day Inside a Night with Matt Bauer (2020)

Singles
"Please Leave a Light on When You Go" (feat. Dave Malloy) (2012)
"Good for Goodness" (2017)
"Time Takes Time" (2017)
"Bells, Boxes" (2017)
"For the First Time" (2019)
"You're the One That I Want" (2019)
"Sonya Alone" (2019)
"Bitter and the Herb" (2020)
"Ugly" with Matt Bauer (2020)
"Night in Saguaro" with Matt Bauer (2020)

Cast recordings
Natasha, Pierre and the Great Comet of 1812 (Highlights From the Original Cast Recording) (2013)
Natasha, Pierre and the Great Comet of 1812 (Original Cast Recording) (2013)
Ghost Quartet (2015)
Ghost Quartet: Live at the McKittrick (2016)
Natasha, Pierre and the Great Comet of 1812 (Original Broadway Cast Recording) (2017)

Awards and nominations
Sources: TheaterMania, Lortel Archives

References

External links
 

American stage actresses
American women singer-songwriters
Actresses from Seattle

Living people

Year of birth missing (living people)

21st-century American women